Hydroxymethylphenol may refer to:

 Gastrodigenin (4-hydroxymethylphenol)
 Salicyl alcohol (2-hydroxymethylphenol)